Chandni Chowk is a 1954 classic Muslim social drama film directed by B. R. Chopra. 

The music was composed by Roshan with lyrics written by Majrooh Sultanpuri, Saifuddin Saif, Kamil Rashid, Shailendra and Raja Mehdi Ali Khan. Story was by D. P. Berry with screenplay by I. S. Johar and dialogue written by Kamil Rashid. Produced by Prince Hira Sinh of Baria and Goverdhandas Aggarwal under the banner of Hira Films. The director of photography was Keki Mistry. The film starred Meena Kumari, Shekhar, Jeevan, Agha, Achala Sachdev and Smriti Biswas. 

The main hero Shekhar was one of the less appreciated lead actors of the 1940s and 1950s but has been cited as a "master of realistic portrayals" usually cast in "mid-budget films".

The story involves a Nawab belonging to the Chandni Chowk area of Delhi in the early 1920s, who gets "tricked into marrying his daughter to the gardener's son".

Plot
The film is set in the early 1920s in the Chandni Chowk area of Delhi. Nawab Safdarjung (Kumar) has a young daughter Zarina (Meena Kumari), who he's keen to get married off. One of the applicants for her hand in marriage is the young Nawab Akbar (Shekhar) of Lucknow. After the wedding takes place, Nawab Safdarjung is informed by Ibrahim Beg (Jeevan) that Akbar is in fact the gardener's son. The plot to introduce Akbar as a Nawab was conceived by Ibrahim to teach the arrogant Nawab a lesson when he refused his newly rich neighbour, Yusuf's (Agha) proposal to marry Zarina, by haughtily declining it for him being a mere vegetable vendor. Angry on learning about the subterfuge, the Nawab calls off the marriage. Zarina however, decides to go to her in-laws house as she now considers Akbar her husband. Akbar leaves for Egypt in the hope of earning money. He finds a job there and soon gets entangled with a dancer Noorie (Smriti Biswas), who falls in love with him. Noorie creates grave misunderstandings in Zarina's life when she reads Zarina's letter to Akbar. She sends off a wire informing the in-laws that Akbar is dead. Finally Noorie dies telling Akbar about the misunderstanding created, and Akbar returns home to his bride.

Cast
 Meena Kumari as Zarina
 Shekhar as Akbar
 Jeevan as Ibrahim
 Agha as Yusuf
 Sunder as Kallan
 Kumar as Nawab Safdar Jung
 Yashodra Kathju as Shabnam
 Tun Tun
 Smriti Biswas as Noorie
 Pratima Devi as Akbar's mother
 Achala Sachdev as Begum
 Krishna Kumari as Laila
 Ramma Sharma as Suraiya
 Kammo as Dancer
 Srinath as Arif
 Abbas Ajmeri as Zaman Khan
 Manmohan Krishna as Mirza
 Naaz as Young Zarina
 Romi as Young Akbar

Box-office
B. R. Chopra had shifted to Bombay from Lahore where he edited the Cine-Herald. In Bombay, Chopra joined Shri Gopal Pictures as a producer. Chopra's first film as a director, Afsana (1951) was a big hit running for over twenty-five weeks (silver-jubilee). Chandni Chowk, Chopra's third directorial venture was also a big success at the box office, which gave him the impetus to start his own film company B. R. Films in 1956.

Soundtrack
The film's music director was Roshan, who went on to compose music for films such as Barsat Ki Rat (1960) and Taj Mahal (1963), winning the Filmfare Award for Best Music Director for the latter film. With lyrics by Majrooh Sultanpuri, Kamil Rashid, Shailendra, Raja Mehdi Ali Khan and Saifuddin Saif. The film's credits however, name only Majrooh Sultanpuri, Shailendra and Raja Mehdi Ali Khan as the lyricists. The playback singing was provided by Lata Mangeshkar, Mohammed Rafi, Asha Bhosle, Mukesh, Shamshad Begum and Usha Mangeshkar.

Song list

References

External links

1954 films
Films scored by Roshan
1950s Hindi-language films
1950s Urdu-language films
Films directed by B. R. Chopra
Indian drama films
1954 drama films
Indian black-and-white films
Urdu-language Indian films